Dianthus libanotis, the Mount Libanus pink or Lebanon pink, is a herbaceous perennial plant of the family Caryophyllaceae.

Description
It is a 25–60 cm high perennial subshrub with spiny leaves. Its white petals are dotted with crimson and pink. Its hermaphrodite fragrant flowers end in filiform tassels that bloom from June to August.

Distribution and habitat
Dianthus libanotis is endemic to parts of western Asia, it grows on rocky outcrops in Lebanon, Syria and northern Israel and Armenia.

References

libanotis
Flora of Western Asia
Flora of Lebanon
Flora of Israel
Flora of Armenia
Flora of Palestine (region)
Taxa named by Jacques Labillardière